Ronnie Båthman and Rikard Bergh successfully defended their title, by defeating Magnus Gustafsson and Anders Järryd 6–4, 6–4 in the final.

Seeds

Draw

Draw

References

External links
 Official results archive (ATP)
 Official results archive (ITF)

Men's Doubles